is a Japanese voice actor from Gunma Prefecture affiliated with the Seinenza Theater Company.

Filmography

Television animation
Cowboy Bebop (1998) (Bartender)
One Piece (2014) (Elizabello II)
Subete ga F ni Naru (2015) (Suwano)
Mobile Suit Gundam: Iron-Blooded Orphans (2015) (Nobliss Gordon)
Rockman EXE (2002) (Dr. Wily)
Rockman EXE Stream (2004) (Dr. Wily)
Rockman EXE Beast (2005) (Dr. Wily)
Rockman EXE Beast+ (2006) (Dr. Wily)
Bamboo Blade (2007) (Tamaki's father)

Unknown date
009-1 (Iron Heart)
Atashin'chi (Master)
Buso Renkin (Doctor Butterfly / Chōno Bakushaku)
Detective Conan (Katsuta, Master, Zenkichi Kuroiwa, Kuino Yajima, Isokichi Kamoi, Hyōgo, Yutaka Niino, Kiyotaka Okonogi)
Crest of the Stars (Guen)
Daphne in the Brilliant Blue (Marchin)
D.Gray-man (Pedoro)
Heat Guy J (Niel Olsen)
Kage Kara Mamoru! (Feudal lord)
Karin (Victor Sinclair)
Lupin the Third: The Woman Called Fujiko Mine (Owl Head)
Magical Girl Lyrical Nanoha A's (Gil Graham)
Mobile Suit Gundam SEED Destiny (Special edition) (Unato Ema Seiran)
Naruto (Hyūga elder)
Naruto Shippuden (Mifune)
Psycho-Pass (Toyohisa Senguji)
My Bride Is a Mermaid (Nagasumi's grandfather)
Sōkō no Strain (Barrow)
Transformers: Armada (Unicron)
Turn A Gundam (Dilan Heim)

OVA
Legend of the Galactic Heroes (????) (Zauken)
Mazinger Z Vs. The Great General of Darkness (Archduke Gorgon)
Sentō Yōsei Yukikaze (Yazawa)
Tekken: The Motion Picture (W.W.W.C. Director)

Theatrical animation
The Boy and the Beast (2015)

Video games
Final Fantasy X (2001) (Kimahri Ronso)
Final Fantasy X-2 (2003) (Kimahri Ronso)
Mega Man Network Transmission (2003) (Dr. Wily)
Tales of Rebirth (2004) (Jiberl)
Tales of the Abyss (2005) (King Ingobert the Sixth)
Tales of the Tempest (2006) (King)
Batman: Arkham Knight (2015) (Lucius Fox)
Final Fantasy VII Remake (2020) (Heideggar)

Tokusatsu
Kamen Rider Ghost (2015) (Machinegun Ganma)

Dubbing

Live-action
The Adventures of Greyfriars Bobby (The Lord Provost (Christopher Lee))
Before Sunset (Bookstore Manager (Vernon Dobtcheff))
Bend It Like Beckham (Mohaan Singh Bhamra (Anupam Kher))
Concussion (Dr. Cyril Wecht (Albert Brooks))
The Crimson Rivers (Dr. Bernard Chernezé (Jean-Pierre Cassel))
Crusader (McGovern (Michael York))
Darkest Hour (Neville Chamberlain (Ronald Pickup))
The Duke (Clive Chives (James Doohan))
Edge of Darkness (Bill Whitehouse (Jay O. Sanders))
For Love of the Game (Gary Wheeler (Brian Cox))
From the Earth to the Moon (James Irwin (Gareth Williams))
Gloria (Ruby (George C. Scott))
Hell Ride (The Deuce (David Carradine))
Home Alone 3 (2019 NTV edition), (Police Captain (Baxter Harris))
The Host (Jebediah "Jeb" Stryder (William Hurt))
Hugo (Monsieur Labisse (Christopher Lee))
I Am Sam (Judge Philip McNeily (Ken Jenkins))
In Bruges (Ken (Brendan Gleeson))
Iron Man 3 (Vice President Rodriguez (Miguel Ferrer))
K-19: The Widowmaker (Marshal Zolentsov (Joss Ackland))
The Legend of Tarzan (Mr. Frum (Simon Russell Beale))
Me, Myself & Irene (Agent Boshane (Richard Jenkins))
Misconduct (Arthur Denning (Anthony Hopkins))
Pirates of the Caribbean: On Stranger Tides (Henry Pelham (Roger Allam))
Royal Pains (Gen. William Collins (Bob Gunton))
The Skulls (Martin Lombard (Christopher McDonald))
The Suicide Squad (Mateo Suárez (Joaquín Cosío))
Team America: World Police (Spottswoode (Daran Norris))
The Way of the Gun (Hale Chidduck (Scott Wilson))
X-Men: First Class (Colonel Hendry (Glenn Morshower))

Animation
Batman: The Brave and the Bold (Kanjar Ro)
The Boondocks (Martin Luther King Jr.)
Spider-Man: Into the Spider-Verse (Uncle Ben)

References

External links
 
Seinenza (Japanese)

1951 births
Japanese male video game actors
Japanese male voice actors
Living people
Male voice actors from Gunma Prefecture
20th-century Japanese male actors
21st-century Japanese male actors